Anandabhadram (”eternally safe”) is a 2005 Indian Malayalam-language dark fantasy horror film based on the novel of the same name by Sunil Parameshwaran. The film was the debut Malayalam film venture of director Santosh Sivan and actress Riya Sen. The story concerns ghosts, spirits, and black magic. The film stars Prithviraj, Kavya Madhavan, Manoj K Jayan, Kalabhavan Mani and Biju Menon.

The film was inspired by the paintings of Raja Ravi Varma, Theyyam, and Kathakali dance movements, and Kalaripayattu martial art forms. It rode on a renewed interest in both Ravi Varma and Kalaripayattu in and outside of India. Anandabhadram was released on November 4 coinciding with Diwali. The film won five awards in the 2005 Kerala State Film Awards and two in the 2005 Asianet Film Awards. It also was a commercial success. During production, Santosh replaced Sabu Cyril with Sunil Babu as the art director, M. G. Radhakrishnan replaced Vidyasagar as the music director, Gireesh Puthenchery replaced Sreekumaran Thampy as the lyricist and Kavya Madhavan replaced Meera Jasmine as the actress. The audiography of the film was done by M. R. Rajakrishnan . It was also dubbed in Tamil, Telugu (as Sivapuram), Hindi (as Phir Wohi Darr) and English, and was an inspiration for Tanthra (2006), another Malayalam film.

Plot
In the ancient village of Shivapuram, little Ananthan hears a tale from his mother, Gayathri. She tells him that his family comes from a line of powerful magicians, and they are responsible for protecting nagamanikyam, a jewel on a serpent's head. The jewel, she narrates, lies in a secret place in the house guarded by snakes, including a tiny snake called Kunjootan.

Years later, obeying the wishes of his dead mother, Ananthan returns to his ancestral village to light the lamps at Shivakavu, a dark and mysterious temple of Shiva. On his way home he meets the comical Maravi Mathai on the train. The local black magician Digambaran opposes the lighting of the lamps on the grounds of local superstitions in order to get his hands on the nagamanikyam. Disbeliever Ananthan meets the supernatural for the first time in his life.

In his effort to fit into the local environment, Ananthan gradually wins the villagers' hearts over by his easy and kind manners. This appreciation is breached briefly when the magician takes over his mind for a short while. Meanwhile, Ananthan's cousin Bhadra falls for him and his light-hearted flirting, eventually leading to a commitment of love between them. At one point, Bhadra faces the dilemma of choosing between Ananthan's love and becoming a Devi in a mystical ritual of self-offering.

Chemban, a blind martial arts expert, stands in the way of Digambaran's hunt for the nagamanikyam. The evil black magician manages to remove Chemban from his way, and leaves a trail of blood in his wake. Digambaran also lures Chemban's sister Bhama. A series of sensuous and evil magical rites follows that features a wide paraphernalia of the exotic, including Kathakali movements, tantric paraphernalia, traditional magic spells.

In the end, Ananthan and Bhadra escape from Digambaran after injuring them badly. However Chemban decides to destroy Digambaran for killing Bhama and to restore peace in the village. After a fight, Chemban cuts off Digambaran's right toe which had a ring of which he killed all who came across him. Later, Ananthan and Bhadra reunite after restoring the Nagamanikyam and Digambaran is seen without eyes which was taken by Chemban.

Cast

Prithviraj Sukumaran as Anandan
Kavya Madhavan as Bhadra
Manoj K Jayan as Digambaran
Kalabhavan Mani as Chemban
Biju Menon as Sivaram
Nedumudi Venu as Bhadra's Father / Padmanabhan Nair
Kalasala Babu as Raman Panikker
Cochin Haneefa as Maravi Mathai
Suresh Krishna as Police Inspector
Riya Sen as Bhama, Chemban's sister
Revathy as Gayathri Devi, Ananthan's mother
Maniyanpilla Raju as Police Constable
Ambika Mohan as Village Lady
Master Thejas as Young Ananthan
Indira Thampi as Bhadra's Mother
Santha Devi
Govindankutty as Sreeni
Kunchan
T. P. Madhavan as Ramunni Nair
Lakshmi Krishnamoorthy as Nangeli Muthassi 
Maya Viswanath
Neethu S Nair as Subhadra, Bhadra's elder sister
Akhila as Ammu, Bhadra's friend

Production

Development
Ananthabhadram is based on the novel of the same name by Sunil Parameswaran. The story was inspired by tales told to Sunil by his grandmother when he was a child. Director Santosh Sivan was also influenced by such stories told by his own grandmother.  Set in rural Kerala, the story is a fairy tale dominated by Shakta black magic, martial arts, and tantric seduction rituals.

Inspirations

Theyyam and Kathakali: Sivan said he received inspiration from the arts of his country: "We have a rich visual culture and even in Ananthabhadram, I have used certain aspects from Theyyam dancers and Kathakali to create the wizard Digambaran's image. The colour, long nails, kohl-lined eyes and so on were inspired from Theyyam and Kathakali." The sequence between Manoj K Jayan using Riya Sen as a channel for black magic, choreographed by Aparna Sindhoor, the dance director of the film, uses Kathakali movements in particular, which has been an inspiration for major Indian films like director Shaji Karun's Vanaprastham (1999) and director Adoor Gopalakrishnan's Kalamandalam Ramankutty Nair (2005).

Kalarippayattu: The film also used Kalarippayattu, the traditional martial art of South India, for the fight sequences between Digambaran and Chemban choreographed by action director Arash. Use of Kalari in the film followed the footsteps of Kalari-based movies like Palattu Koman (1962), Thacholi Othenan (1964), Kannappanunni (1977) and Oru Vadakkan Veeragatha (1989), as well as famous martial art film actor Jackie Chan's The Myth. After Asoka, it was the second time the director had used Kalari (as it is known in popular coinage).

Raja Ravi Varma: The director used three paintings of Raja Ravi Varma – Damayanti and the swan, Lady in thought and Girl carrying milk tray – as inspiration to picturize the song Pinakkamano (acted by Prithviraj Sukumaran and Kavya Madhavan; sung by M. G. Sreekumar and Manjari; choreographed by Aparna Sindhoor). Sivan said, "Yes, it is a tribute to Raja Ravi Varma, who is so intrinsically etched in every Malayali's mind." This song came in the wake of a renewed interest in Varma's work in Indian showbiz, as evidenced in Indian pop star Falguni Pathak's music video for the song "Meri Chunar Ud Ud Jaaye" (2001, acted by Trisha Krishnan) which emulated Varma's Shakuntala and Shaji Karun's declared film to be made on the artist's life which would feature Madhuri Dixit (actress of Gaja Gamini, a film by painter M.F. Hussain).

Pattanam Rasheed said about the make-up of the Pinakkamano sequence, "The skin tone I gave the characters is akin to an oil painting, orange-yellow shades, which give a painting-like look. That is why you feel that a painting is coming to life in some shots. The eye and eye brow make-up is also different, according to the old styles in the paintings." Costumer Satheesh said, "Not one of the saris that Kavya wears is complete in itself. To get the colours of the body and border of the sari as close as possible to the ones in the paintings, I shopped in Chennai, Bangalore and Kochi. I had to attach the borders to some of the saris and dyed some to get the right shade... I had to rework all the jewels, with a few stones from one chain added to another." art director Sunil Babu points out that despite attempts at accuracy, in the Damayanthi scene, the swan is missing.

Pre-production
Sabu Cyril was originally scheduled to direct the film with actress Meera Jasmine in the lead. Production was delayed due to a strike in the Malayalam film industry in June 2004. Later, Cyril became busy with Shankar's film Anniyan. At this point, Santosh Sivan stepped in to replace Cyril. Cyril's assistant Sunil Babu art directed the film.

Filming
Like his earlier directorial ventures Asoka and The Terrorist (a.k.a. Malli), Santosh was also the cinematographer for Anathabhadram. Prithviraj as the hero had his biggest success of 2005, out of the five cinemas he did that year. Manoj K Jayan was to have a sannyasin look with long hair in the proposed Sabu Cyril version, but sported a more contemporary look in the version that was eventually shot, winning much critical accolades.

Music

Initially Sabu Cyril was the film director and Santhosh Sivan was the Cinematographer. Vidyasagar composed songs for the film penned by Sreekumaran Thampi. The songs were never recorded. After some months Sabu Cyril opted not to direct the film due to other reasons. And the film was taken over by Santosh Sivan who appointed M. G. Radhakrishnan for the film. Radhakrishnan went on to win Asianet Film Awards as the best music director for the film's tracks. He also did the score for Sivapuram, the Telugu version of the film. M. G. Sreekumar won Asianet Award as the Best Male Playback Singer for singing "Pinakkamano".

Release
It is the first Malayalam feature screened using a satellite feed instead of conventional prints; aimed at an international market. it was also dubbed in Tamil, Telugu (as Sivapuram), and English. The release of Anandabhadram in India followed that of the horror movie Chandramukhi, starring Rajnikanth, which was a remake of the Malayalam film Manichitrathazhu, creating a brief success for the horror genre. The film was showcased in Osian's Cinefan Festival of Asian and Arab Cinema in 2006.

Reception
Anandabhadram was a commercial success. According to Maniyanpilla Raju, the film ended up an average grosser as it was released on the same day as Mammootty's blockbuster Rajamanikyam and could not compete with it. Pinakkamano became the top hit among Malayalam film songs in 2005. The film also inspired director KJ Bose's Tanthra (2006) featuring actors Siddique and Shweta Menon. Sunil Babu, the art director, came to the notice of Kerala audience because of the film, especially his treatment for Raja Ravi Varma inspired songs. The performance of Manoj K. Jayan was critically acclaimed.

Accolades
Anandabhadram won five awards in the Kerala State Film Awards for 2005, including Best Cinematography (Santosh Sivan), Best Music Direction (MG Radhakrishnan), Best Editing (Sreekar Prasad), Best Art Direction (Sunil Babu) and Best Makeup (Pattanam Rasheed). It won five awards in the Kerala Film Critics Association Awards 2005, including Best Film, Best Director (Santhosh Sivan), Best Actor (Manoj K Jayan), and Best Cinematography (Santhosh Sivan). M. R. Rajakrishnan had won the Amritha Fertanity Award for Best Audiography for his work in this film.

See also 
 List of Malayalam horror films

References

External links 
 
 
 Anandabhadram at the Malayalam Movie Database

2000s Malayalam-language films
2005 fantasy films
2005 films
Films based on Indian novels
Films scored by M. G. Radhakrishnan
Films shot in Ottapalam
Films shot at Varikkasseri Mana
Indian dark fantasy films
Indian ghost films
Indian horror films
Films directed by Santosh Sivan